This is a list of election results for the Electoral district of Mallee in South Australian elections.

Members for Mallee

Election results

Elections in the 1980s

The two candidate preferred vote was not counted between the Liberal and National candidates for Mallee.

Elections in the 1970s

The two candidate preferred vote was not counted between the Liberal and Country candidates for Mallee.

References

South Australian state electoral results by district